The Photographers' Gallery and Workshop (1973–2010) was an Australian photography gallery established in South Yarra, Melbourne, and which ran almost continuously for nearly 40 years. Its representation, in the 1970s and 1980s, of contemporary and mid-century, mostly American and some European original fine prints from major artists was influential on Australian audiences and practitioners, while a selection of the latter's work sympathetic to the gallery ethos was shown alternately and then dominated the program.

Other uses 
An unrelated space also called "The Photographers' Gallery" ran for three years from 1989–1992 in Brisbane; another, the Photographer's Gallery [sic], was operating in Sydney in the c.1993-2000s at 96 Reserve Road, Artarmon,; and the 2006 Head-On Portrait Prize Exhibition was held in Balmain, also in Sydney at a short-lived venue called "The Photographers Gallery".

History

Paul Cox, Ingeborg Tyssen, John F. Williams and Rod McNicoll founded The Photographers' Gallery and Workshop in 1973 at 344 Punt Road, South Yarra in an 1888 two-storey fruiterer's shop and dwelling (originally a bootmaker's) in the 'Sharp's Buildings' terrace, rented since 1965 as a photographer's studio and accommodation by Paul Cox, who from 1969–c.1980 taught cinematography at Prahran College.

It was the second gallery devoted to photography to be established in the city after Rennie Ellis' and Robert Ashton's Brummels Gallery, which was started in 1972 less than a kilometre away, and before the Church Street Photography Centre run by Joyce Evans in neighbouring Richmond (1976).

Gallery 
Ian Lobb, an Australian born in 1948, who had undertaken workshops with Ansel Adams and Paul Caponigro, took over the Gallery in late 1974. Also that year, Lobb was teaching photography at Coburg Technical School with Carol Jerrems, and they met American Bill Heimerman (born 13 January 1950) who was teaching English at the same institution and was renting rooms above the gallery; the two inspired Heimerman's interest in photography. Lobb mounted his first exhibition as director at the beginning of 1975. He and Heimerman became co-directors of the gallery from the beginning of 1976. Beside some government funding and sales, both financially supported their roles through teaching, Heimerman being next employed at Brighton Technical College, where he and other staff members established a photography program, and then at the Council of Adult Education. Critic and photography lecturer Tony Perry noted Heimerman's 'detached, informed view of photography'.

Lobb and Heimerman showed some local work, but pursued high profile international, mainly American and some European, photographers for exhibitions. The first exhibition of international photography at the gallery was that of Paul Caponigro in 1975 which sold 22 prints, after which success the gallery was closed for renovations and while Heimerman made a trip to the US to secure more shows. After the refurbishment Melbourne Times critic Wendy Harmer described the space as "an oasis of pristine white walls and warm, polished wood.

Workshop 
As well as exhibitions, and from the outset, workshops were held in the gallery building from which part of the funding for the enterprise was derived. The two floors of the terrace building accommodated a two-person darkroom available for film development and printing, and a demonstration room with 6-8 student capacity. Printing for exhibitions was offered. Technical instruction for beginners and in the Zone System for those more advanced was provided at first by Australian photographer Steven Lojewski in 1976. Evening classes ran for ten weeks. By 1977 Heimerman and Lobb had organised the first workshop to be conducted in Australia by an American photographer, Ralph Gibson, and sponsored another, of 6 days by William Clift in May 1978 (costing participants $200), before Lobb left to pursue his own photography later that year. Jeff Busby, who also exhibited at the gallery, took over later as Heimerman's assistant.

Among the more recent workshops was 'How Joshua Greene Saved Marilyn Monroe: Techniques to Rehabilitate Ageing Photographs and the Art of Digital Printing', held on 26 November 2002 by the son of  Milton H. Greene who photographed Monroe.

In addition to its activities at its own premises was the Gallery's organisation and sponsorship of seminars by international photographers, which began with Ralph Gibson's on 11 August 1977 at Prahran College, then that of Harry Callahan, held on 20 November 1979 at the Prahran Recreational Centre, 147 High Street with also a workshop at the Gallery.

Ethos 
By showcasing the silver gelatin 'fine print’  Lobb and Heimerman hoped to improve Australian work by example, as Lobb observed, 
"From 1975, every second show was an international show [. . .] The initial philosophy was simply to let people see the physical difference between the production of prints overseas and locally."
In 1981 however, The Age newspaper listed the gallery's aims as being;

Reception 

Curator Joyce Agee in 1988 noted that, with feminist photography on the ascendant, the gallery's ambitions irritated some Australian women photographers; 
In the 1970s, Micky Allan, the late Carol Jerrems, Ruth Maddison, Sue Ford and Ponch Hawkes, reacting against the technocratic and patriarchal American West Coast 'fine print' tradition then being promoted by The Photographers' Gallery in Melbourne, began to use photography as an intimate expression of their individual concerns.

Nevertheless, Jerrems was amongst the first exhibitors at the Gallery, showing there four times before her premature death in 1980. Noted women's activist Beatrice Faust, who reviewed many of the gallery's shows from 1976-88 in The Age newspaper, was supportive in her critiques, and in September 1987 hosted Beatrice Faust Curates: From Boubat to Fereday at the gallery featuring male and female photographers.

Certainly women exhibiting were outnumbered by men in a ratio of nearly 10:1 until the 90s, after which they appear on a more equal footing (see below).

The Gallery's concentration on American photography in its early years was not in isolation and was prompted as much by interest in international photography amongst Australians as by Heimerman's own contacts in the US, and paralleled international touring exhibitions of Bill Brandt in 1971, and the French Foreign Ministry's major exhibition of Henri Cartier-Bresson in 1974. Joyce Evans' Church Street also presented work by American's Minor White, Jerry Uelsmann, Les Krims and others.

In mid-1978, the gallery extended a call in the pages of the magazine Light Vision to Australian photographers to submit work for a survey that was to be a traveling exhibition. The final selection, featured in the journal in a double number, 6 and 7, titled 'Special Australian Edition', issued October 1978 with two samples across double-page spreads of each of 21 photographers, many represented and selected by the Photographers Gallery, among them a number who were also 'Correspondents' for Light Vision at the time. Editor Jean-Marc Le Pechoux acknowledged the cooperative nature of the venture in his editorial, and in her introduction Memory Holloway emphasised the breadth of the selection; "...a plurality of techniques, ideologies and styles; social documentary; pictorial, surreal landscapes; nudes; portraits; straight photography." Four of the 21 contributors were women, but the exercise marked a shift in the program toward a gender-inclusive representation of Australian photographers of diverse styles and often radical attitudes to picture-making and photographic printing and presentation.

Tony Perry, who reviewed shows there 1978-80, was complimentary of contributions by William Heimermann and the 'Photographers Gallery' to Australian Photography in his article 'Australia: looking for a photographic identity', as was Peter Turner's interview with Paul Cox in Light Vision.

In 1981, The Age newspaper critic Geoff Strong, in reporting on the imminent closure of Joyce Evans' Church Street gallery, noted that The Photographers' Gallery was also facing tough times during a recession, rising unemployment and a general downturn in the fortunes of art galleries;

The status and purpose of the Photographers' Gallery over its long tenure continued to evolve. Critic Beatrice Faust, a supporter of the gallery since its inception, in The Age in January 1990 observed;

Nevertheless, the Gallery was to survive for another twenty years.

Closure
The gallery was closed in 2010 and sold in 2015, and after a period of failing health, Bill Heimerman died on 1 October 2017.

Legacy
In the 1970s, with the decline of the pictorial magazines and a consequent crisis in photojournalism and documentary photography, a revival of the pre-WW2 interest in photography as a fine art was a world-wide phenomenon, as it was in Australia. In 1972, Beatrice Faust, in reviewing Two Views of Erotica: Henry Talbot/Carol Jerrems at Brummels Gallery in Nation Review urged;

The Photographers' Gallery and Workshop, because of its policy of sourcing and promoting established international work of a high standard, was well placed when percipient private collectors were entering the market in fine photographic prints, and major Australian institutions were initiating collections of photography.

The inaugural curator of the new photography department Jennie Boddington at the newly (1968) re-housed National Gallery of Victoria; Alison Carroll and Ian North of the Art Gallery of South Australia (which had begun to collect photography as a distinct discipline from the mid-1920s, its building expanded in 1962, refurbished 1979); and David Moore and Wes Stacey at the Australian Centre for Photography (est. 1973); all purchased from the Photographers' Gallery, with special interest in American and European works, along with the National Gallery of Australia, which though not built and opened until 1982, had started a photography collection in 1972. Its director James Mollison turned the sponsorship of the tobacco company Philip Morris International to the acquisition of Australian photography. These sales contributed significantly to the standing and survival of the Gallery, particularly in its early years of the 1970s and 1980s.
An archive of The Photographers' Gallery and Workshop is maintained by Heimerman's partner, Barbara Derrick.

Exhibitions

Other solo or group exhibitions at the Gallery presented photographers Paul Hopper and Ingeborg Tyssen. In 1982 The Photographers' Gallery presented Aaron Siskind at Reconnaissance in Fitzroy in a joint venture.

References

1973 establishments in Australia
2015 disestablishments in Australia
Art galleries established in 1973
Art galleries disestablished in 2010
Art museums and galleries in Melbourne
Photography in Australia
Photography museums and galleries in Australia